Kao Yi-feng (born 10 September 1973) is a Taiwanese novelist, screenwriter and director.

Works

Novels 
Imaginary Ship 《幻艙》（Aquarius Publishing 寶瓶，2011）
War of the Bubbles 《泡沫戰爭》（Aquarius Publishing 寶瓶，2014）
2069 《2069》（Thinkingdom Media Group Ltd. 新經典文化，2019）

Short story collections 
This prison called home 《家，這個牢籠》（Elite Books 爾雅，2002）
Désincarnation 《肉身蛾》（Aquarius Publishing 寶瓶，2004）
Running Through the Beautiful Light 《奔馳在美麗的光裡》（Aquarius Publishing 寶瓶，2006）
Burning Crows 《烏鴉燒》（Aquarius Publishing 寶瓶，2012）

TV movie 
Pucevuljan 《煙起的地方Pucevuljan》（2017）

References

External links

21st-century Taiwanese writers
Living people
1973 births
Chinese Culture University alumni
Taiwanese male novelists
Taiwanese television directors